is a Japanese manga series written and illustrated by Yutsuko Chūsonji. Originally serialized in the magazine  from 1989 to 1992, the series follows an office lady (OL) with a passion for golf. The series is credited with originating the slang term , used to describe young businesswomen who have interests and hobbies stereotypically associated with middle-aged businessmen. In 1991, Sweet Spot was adapted into an original video animation (OVA) directed by Gisaburō Sugii.

Synopsis
Set against the backdrop of bubble-era Tokyo, Sweet Spot follows the life of Oyamada Non, a 23-year-old office lady. Oyamada and the women who work at her office are oyaji gals: women who have a passion for activities generally associated with middle-aged men, such as golf, karaoke, and horse betting.

Media

Manga
Sweet Spot was serialized in the magazine  from 1989 to 1992. It was published as eight tankōbon (collected editions) by Fusosha Publishing:

Original video animation
An original video animation (OVA) adaptation of Sweet Spot, directed by Gisaburō Sugii and produced by Fuji TV, Group TAC, and Pony Canyon, was released on April 21, 1991. All of the characters in the OVA are voiced by news presenters for Fuji TV, with the exception of Oyamada, who is voiced by actress Yumi Morio.

Impact
Sweet Spot originated the Japanese slang term , used to describe upwardly-mobile young businesswomen who have interests and hobbies stereotypically associated with middle-aged businessmen. The Los Angeles Times noted in 1991 that the oyaji gal was "the latest figure in the evolution of Japanese women that has seen the 'body-con' or body conscious woman with hip-hugging clothes; the giggling burriko, whose hallmark is everything cute, and the 'O. L.,' or office lady, who serves tea and makes photocopies while waiting for Mr. Right." In his book Japan in the 21st Century, academic Pradyumna Karan cites Sweet Spot as an example of the "perception gap between the sexes" in Japan during the bubble era, in the way that it "pokes fun at workaholic men and salutes the leisurely attitudes of young female workers."

References

External links
 
 

1978 manga
1991 anime OVAs
Seinen manga
Fusosha Publishing manga